was a Japanese idol project group associated with Hello! Project. It was formed by Up-Front Promotion in 2003. Its members consisted of Morning Musume member Mari Yaguchi and Hello! Project Kids members Erika Umeda, Saki Shimizu, Maimi Yajima, Momoko Tsugunaga, and Megumi Murakami. The group remained active until 2004.

History
The name ZYX is a kind of acronym using a somewhat intricate play in notation. "Z" and "Y" are taken from the phrase  "Bai ni," meaning "double in size," is represented not as "B" but as a multiplication sign "×" which was then represented by the letter "X." Also, the letters ZYX are the last letters of the English alphabet in reverse order. In Hello! Project, this inverted order naming is followed by the groups "W" created in 2004, "v-u-den" in 2005, "The Possible" in 2006, and SI☆NA in 2008. This line-up of groups continues the reverse alphabetical naming (ZYX-W-VU-T-S).

On February 28 and March 1, 2015, ZYX reformed for Berryz Kobo Matsuri with Momoko Tsuguana, Saki Shimizu and Maimi Yajima to perform "Shiroi Tokyo", the first time members of the original ZYX line-up have reformed under the name ZYX since 2006.

Members 
 Mari Yaguchi (Leader)
 Erika Umeda
 Saki Shimizu
 Maimi Yajima
 Momoko Tsugunaga
 Megumi Murakami

Legacy

In 2009, ZYX was revived as ZYX-Alpha (stylized as ZYX-α) as a Hello! Project Shuffle Unit. Tsugunaga and Umeda, now members of Berryz Kobo and Cute respectively, rejoined as members of the group. New additions to the group included Morning Musume members Risa Niigaki and Koharu Kusumi; Berryz Kobo member Chinami Tokunaga and Maasa Sudo; and Smileage members Ayaka Wada and Saki Ogawa. The group released songs for Hello! Project's compilation albums Champloo 1: Happy Marriage Song Cover Shū and Petit Best 10. The group was also active as a concert-only unit until 2011. In 2013, for Hello! Project's 15th anniversary, Tsugunaga, Sudo, Wada, Tokunaga, and Niigaki (as a special guest) performed together.

Discography

Singles

DVDs

References

Japanese girl groups
Japanese idol groups
Japanese pop music groups
Musical groups established in 2003
Hello! Project groups
Musical groups from Tokyo